Reiner Gamma (γ) is a geographical feature of the Moon known as a lunar swirl. It is one of the most visible lunar swirls from Earth, visible from most telescopes. It was originally thought to be a lunar highland, but scientists eventually realized that it cast no shadow on the moon.

Origin
The origin of Reiner Gammalike other lunar swirlsis not completely understood. It is associated with a localized magnetic field, but not with any particular irregularities in the surface. Similar features have been discovered in Mare Ingenii and Mare Marginis by orbiting spacecraft. The feature on Mare Ingenii is located at the lunar opposite point from the center of Mare Imbrium. Likewise the feature on Mare Marginis is opposite the midpoint of Mare Orientale. Thus one hypothesis is that the feature resulted from seismic energies generated by the impacts that created these maria. However, no such lunar mare formation is on the opposite side of the Moon from Reiner Gamma.

Location and Features

Reiner Gamma is located on the Oceanus Procellarum, west of the crater Reiner. Its center is located at selenographic coordinates . It has an overall length of about 70 kilometres. The feature has a higher albedo than the relatively dark mare surface, with a diffuse appearance and a distinctive swirling, concentric oval shape. Related albedo features continue across the surface to the east and southwest, forming loop-like patterns over the mare.

The central feature of Reiner Gamma resembles the dipolar formation created by iron filings on a surface with a bar magnet on the underside. Low-orbiting spacecraft have observed a relatively strong magnetic field associated with each of these albedo markings. Some have speculated that this magnetic field and the patterns were created by cometary impacts. However the true cause remains uncertain.

This is one of the strongest localized magnetic anomalies on the Moon. As the particles in the solar wind are known to darken the lunar surface, the magnetic field at this site may account for the survival of this albedo feature.

In early lunar maps by Francesco Maria Grimaldi, this feature was incorrectly identified as a crater. His colleague Giovanni Riccioli then named it Galilaeus, after Galileo Galilei. The name was later transferred northwest to the current crater Galilaei.

References

Other references
 Ewen A. Whitaker, Mapping and Naming the Moon: A History of Lunar Cartography and Nomenclature, Cambridge University Press, 1999, .

External links
 
 Overexposed 35mm Nikon camera image of Reiner Gamma from Apollo 17: AS17-158-23895
 Lunar Orbiter 4 image showing Reiner Gamma in upper left: IV-157-H1

Geological features on the Moon